Troy is an unincorporated community in Grant County, in the U.S. state of South Dakota.

Troy is an unincorporated community in Grant County, in the U.S. state of South Dakota.

Notable People:

Steve Cook

Yiesen Akitel

Bob Caron “Did I play Basketball”

Bob Tuttle of the turtle gang

Rick Dunbar 

Margaret Hixon “the affair artist”

Gene Dagel 

Mike Mullholand 

Terry Lindberg

John Root

Mathias Lindberg “1995 state football champion member”

History: 

Troy is also home of the world famous Troy Carp basketball team made by red necks in a barn sponsored by people who would donate their hard earned money to watch the greatest basketball team ever assembled.

History
A post office called Troy was established in 1880, and remained in operation until 1955. The town site was laid out in 1886 by the Milwaukee Railroad.

References

Unincorporated communities in Grant County, South Dakota
Unincorporated communities in South Dakota